Joseph Williams  ( – ) was a Welsh international footballer. He was part of the Wales national football team, playing 1 match on 17  March 1884 against England .

See also
 List of Wales international footballers (alphabetical)
 List of Wales international footballers born outside Wales

References

1857 births
Welsh footballers
Wales international footballers
Place of birth missing
Year of death missing
Association footballers not categorized by position